Acantharctia vittata is a moth of the family Erebidae. It was described by Per Olof Christopher Aurivillius in 1899 and is found in Botswana and South Africa.

References 

Moths described in 1899
Spilosomina
Moths of Africa